Feldman is a German and Ashkenazi Jewish surname. Notable people with the surname include:

Academics
 Arthur Feldman (born 1949), American cardiologist
 David B. Feldman, American psychologist
 David Feldman (historian), American historian
 David Feldman (lawyer), British lawyer
 Gerald Feldman, American Historian
 Grigory Feldman (1884–1958), Soviet mathematician and economist
 Heidi Li Feldman, American law professor
 Joel Feldman (born Ottawa), Canadian physicist and mathematician
 Józef Feldman (1899–1946), Polish historian
 Lewis J. Feldman (born 1945), American botanist
 Lisa Feldman Barrett (born 1963), American psychologist
 Louis Feldman  (1926–2017), American scholar of literature
 Marcus Feldman (born 1942), Australian geneticist
 Michal Feldman, Israeli computer scientist
 Noah Feldman (born 1970), American lawyer
 Shirley Feldman (born 1944), American psychologist
 William Hugh Feldman (1892–1974), Scottish-American veterinarian and professor of pathology

Film, television, radio, and theater
 Andrea Feldman (1948–1972), American actress
 Andrew Barth Feldman (born 2002), American actor
 Ben Feldman (born 1980), American actor
 Charles K. Feldman (1905–1968), American film agent and producer
 Corey Feldman (born 1971), American actor
 David Feldman (comedian), American comedy writer and performer
 Donna Feldman (born 1982), American model and actress
 Edward H. Feldman (1920–1988), American director and producer
 Edward S. Feldman (1929–2020), American film and television producer
 Juan Feldman (born 1972), Uruguayan-American film producer and director
 Krystyna Feldman (1916–2007), Polish actress
 Liz Feldman (born 1977), American comedian, actress, producer and writer
 Marty Feldman (1934–1982), British actor and comedian
 Michael Feldman (born 1949), American radio personality
 Tamara Feldman (born 1980), American actress
 Tibor Feldman (born 1947), Slovak-American actor

Musicians
 Bert Feldman (1874–1945), British music publisher
 Bob Feldman (born 1940), American songwriter and record producer
 David Feldman (musician) (born 1977), Brazilian-Israeli jazz and bossa nova musician
 Eric Drew Feldman (born 1955), American keyboard and bass guitar player
 Lee Feldman (born 1959), American singer-songwriter and musician
 Mark Feldman (born 1955), American jazz violinist
 Maxine Feldman (1945–2007),  American folk singer-songwriter and comedian
 Morton Feldman (1926–1987), American composer
 Nick Feldman (born 1955), British musician
 Victor Feldman (1934–1987), British jazz musician
 Oscar Feldman (born 1961), Argentinean jazz saxophonist

Politicians and diplomats
 Andrew Feldman, Baron Feldman of Elstree (born 1966), British barrister, businessman and politician
 Basil Feldman, Baron Feldman (1923–2019), British politician
 Harvey Feldman (1931–2009), American diplomat
 Mike Feldman (born c. 1928), Canadian politician

Religious figures
 Abraham J. Feldman (1893–1977), Ukrainian-American rabbi
 Aharon Feldman (born 1932), American rabbi
 Emanuel Feldman (born 1927), American rabbi
 Ilan D. Feldman, American rabbi
 Pinchus Feldman (born 1945), Australian rabbi

Sportspeople
 Dave Feldman (born 1965), American sportscaster
 Harry Feldman  (1919–1962), American baseball player
 Luke Feldman (born 1984), Australian cricketer
 Scott Feldman (born 1983), American baseball player

Other
 Amy Feldman (born 1981), American abstract painter
 David Feldman (author) (born 1950), American writer
 David Feldman (philatelist) (born 1947), Irish philatelist
 David N. Feldman (born 1960), American lawyer
 Deborah Feldman (born 1986), American writer
 Heinrich Feldman (born 1935), British property investor
 Lee Feldman (businessman) (born 1967/68), American lawyer and businessman
 Martin Leach-Cross Feldman (1934-2022), American judge
 Michael Feldman (consultant) (born 1968), American public relations consultant
 Miroslav Feldman  (1899–1976), Croatian poet and writer

See also
 David Feldman (disambiguation)
 
 Feldmann
 Klee

German-language surnames
Jewish surnames
Yiddish-language surnames